Lorenz Schmidt from the University of Erlangen-Nuremberg, Erlangen, Germany was named Fellow of the Institute of Electrical and Electronics Engineers (IEEE) in 2016 for contributions to millimeter-wave and terahertz imaging systems.

References 

Fellow Members of the IEEE
Living people
Academic staff of the University of Erlangen-Nuremberg
Year of birth missing (living people)
Place of birth missing (living people)
German electrical engineers